Tayyab Riaz (born 20 February 1992) is a Pakistani cricketer. He made his first-class debut for Khan Research Laboratories in the 2012–13 President's Trophy on 3 October 2012.

References

External links
 

1992 births
Living people
Pakistani cricketers
Khan Research Laboratories cricketers
Rawalpindi cricketers
Place of birth missing (living people)